Tatchakorn Yeerum (formerly Phanom Yeerum; born 5 February 1976), better known internationally as Tony Jaa  and in Thailand as Jaa Phanom, is a Thai martial artist, actor, action choreographer, stuntman, director, and traceur. His films include Ong-Bak: Muay Thai Warrior (2003), Tom-Yum-Goong (2005), Ong Bak 2: The Beginning (2008), Furious 7 (2015) and SPL II: A Time for Consequences (2015).

Early life
Tony Jaa was born and raised in a rural area in Surin Province to Rin Saipetch and Thongdee Yeerum. He is of Kuy descent, a Mon–Khmer ethnic group that inhabits Thailand, Cambodia and Laos.  The Kuy practice traditions that are more similar to the traditions of Cambodia than that of traditions observed by the Lao or the Thai.  The Kuy are known for being skilled trainers of elephants. Tony Jaa speaks Kuy, Thai and Northern Khmer.

In his youth, Jaa watched films by Bruce Lee, Jackie Chan and Jet Li at temple fairs, which inspired him to learn martial arts. He practiced the techniques in his father's rice paddy.

"What they [Lee, Chan, and Li] did was so beautiful, so heroic that I wanted to do it too," Jaa told Time in a 2004 interview. "I practiced until I could do the move exactly as I had seen the masters do it."

Jaa began training in Muay Thai at his local temple at age 10. By 15, he was a protégé of stuntman and action film director Panna Rittikrai. Panna had instructed Jaa to attend Maha Sarakham College of Physical Education in Maha Sarakham Province from which he graduated with a bachelor's degree.

Career

Stunt work
Jaa initially worked as a stuntman for Muay Thai Stunt for 14 years, appearing in many of Rittikrai's films. He doubled for Sammo Hung when the martial-arts movie actor made a commercial for an energy drink that required him to grasp an elephant's tusks and somersault onto the elephant's back. He was also a stunt double in the Thai television series Insee Daeng (Red Eagle).

2003–2008

Together, Panna and Jaa developed an interest in Muay Boran, the predecessor of muay thai and worked and trained for four years at the art with the intention of developing a film about it. Eventually they were able to put together a short film showing what Jaa could do with the help of instructor Grandmaster Mark Harris. One of the people they showed it to was producer-director Prachya Pinkaew.

This led to Ong-Bak: Muay Thai Warrior in 2003, Jaa's break-out role as a leading man. Jaa did all the stunts without mechanical assistance or computer-generated effects and it showcased his style of extreme acrobatics and speedy, dance-like moves. Injuries suffered in the filming included a ligament injury and a sprained ankle. One scene in the film involved fighting with another actor while his own trousers were on fire. "I actually got burned," he said in a 2005 interview. "I really had to concentrate because once my pants were on fire the flames spread upwards very fast and burnt my eyebrows, my eyelashes and my nose. Then we had to do a couple more takes to get it right."

His second major movie was Tom-Yum-Goong (The Protector in the US), named after Tom yum soup, which included a style of Muay Thai that imitates elephants.

In August 2006, he was in New York to promote the US release of The Protector, including an appearance at the Museum of the Moving Image.

Sahamongkol Film International advertised that Tony Jaa's third film would be called Sword or Daab Atamas, about the art of Thai two-sword fighting (daab song mue), with a script by Prapas Chonsalanont. But due to a falling out between Prachya and Jaa, which neither have publicly commented on, Sword was cancelled.

In March 2006, it was reported that there would be a sequel to Ong-Bak, Ong-Bak 2. With Jaa both directing and starring, it started pre-production in fall 2006 and was released in December 2008.

Jaa's films captured the attention of his hero, Jackie Chan, who asked director Brett Ratner to cast Jaa in Rush Hour 3. "I gave the director videos of Tony Jaa because I think Tony Jaa is the most well-rounded of all action stars," Chan told the Associated Press. "The director liked him a lot," Chan said. However, Jaa said he'd be unable to participate because of scheduling conflicts with the shooting of Ong Bak 2.

While Jaa and Amogelang were working on Ong-Bak 2, director Prachya Pinkaew and action ya choreographer Panna Rittikrai were working on Chocolate, starring a female martial artist, Nicharee Vismistananda and released 6 February 2008. Jaa had been cast in a small role in a third installment of the King Naresuan film series directed by Chatrichalerm Yukol, although the film was ultimately cancelled. Ong Bak 3 was released in 2010 and provides a conclusion to this Thai trilogy.

2010–present

Tony Jaa and Panna Rittikrai co-directed Ong Bak 3, the 2010 sequel to the prequel Ong Bak 2.

On 28 May 2010, Jaa became a Buddhist monk at a Buddhist temple in Surin, Thailand.

After leaving the monastery, Jaa accepted a deal with Sahamongkol film company. He filmed Tom Yum Goong 2 for them, with Chocolate star Jija Yanin in a major role too, the first time Jaa has shared the big screen with another international martial arts star. Director Prachya Pinkaew and choreographer Panna Rittikrai also returned for this film.

In 2013, Jaa teamed up with Dolph Lundgren in the Thai western-comedy A Man Will Rise (which remains unfinished) and in 2014 in Lundgren's pet project Skin Trade. Jaa then co-starred in the blockbuster action film Furious 7, produced by and starring Vin Diesel and directed by James Wan. Jaa also teamed up with fellow actors Louis Koo and Wu Jing in Hong Kong-Chinese action film SPL II.

Jaa was briefly attached to the remake of Kickboxer: Vengeance. However, in November 2014, it was announced that he had exited the project. Jaa's most recent project was co-starring with Vin Diesel again in XXX: Return of Xander Cage, directed by D.J. Caruso and released in January 2017.

In October 2016, Jaa co-starred with Louis Koo again in Paradox, the third part of the SPL series.

Personal life
Jaa married his longtime girlfriend Piyarat Chotiwattananont on 3 May 2012. The couple have two daughters.

Filmography

Film

Television

Singles

Music videos

Video games

Awards and nominations

See also

 Panna Rittikrai
 Muay Thai Stunt

References

External links

 
 

1976 births
Tony Jaa
Tony Jaa
Living people
Tony Jaa
Tony Jaa
Tony Jaa
Tony Jaa
Tony Jaa
Tony Jaa
Tony Jaa